North Edmonton is a former village in Alberta, Canada that was absorbed by the City of Edmonton. The approximate geographic centre of the former village is the current intersection of Fort Road, 66 Street and 127 Avenue in northeast Edmonton. Its land is now occupied by the Edmonton neighbourhoods of Balwin, Belvedere, Industrial Heights, Kennedale Industrial and Yellowhead Corridor East.

History 
Development here grew up after the arrival of the Canadian Northern Railway in Edmonton in 1905.
It was commonly known as Packingtown, due to the large number of meatpacking plants that grew up in the area, especially along 66th Street.
It became the home of a Franciscan friary, built on land acquired by Bishop Emile Legal, The facility continued in operation until 2005.

The Village of North Edmonton was incorporated on January 20, 1910, encompassing four quarter sections of land. It had a population of 404 in 1911.

The village was annexed by Edmonton on July 22, 1912.

See also 
List of former urban municipalities in Alberta

References 

1910 establishments in Alberta
1912 disestablishments in Canada
Former municipalities now in Edmonton
Former villages in Alberta
Localities in Edmonton